Thioalkalivibrio nitratis is an obligately alkaliphilic and obligately chemolithoautotrophic sulfur-oxidizing bacteria. It was first isolated from soda lakes in northern Russia.

References

Further reading
Ballows, A., et al. "The prokaryotes, a handbook on the biology of bacteria: Ecophysiology, isolation, identification, applications." Springer-verlag 1 (1992): 811–815.
Neilson, Alasdair H., and Ann-Sofie Allard. Organic Chemicals in the Environment: Mechanisms of Degradation and Transformation. CRC Press, 2012.
Klotz, Martin G., Donald A. Bryant, and Thomas E. Hanson. "The microbial sulfur cycle." Frontiers in microbiology 2 (2011).

External links
LPSN

Type strain of Thioalkalivibrio nitratis at BacDive -  the Bacterial Diversity Metadatabase

Chromatiales